Miho Saeki and Yuka Yoshida were the defending champions but lost in the quarterfinals to Kristine Kunce and Corina Morariu.

Kunce and Morariu won in the final 6–3, 6–4 against Florencia Labat and Dominique Van Roost.

Seeds
Champion seeds are indicated in bold text while text in italics indicates the round in which those seeds were eliminated.

 Henrieta Nagyová /  Helena Vildová (first round)
 Sung-Hee Park /  Shi-Ting Wang (quarterfinals)
 Rika Hiraki /  Tamarine Tanasugarn (first round)
 Florencia Labat /  Dominique Van Roost (final)

Draw

External links
 1997 Volvo Women's Open Doubles Draw

Doubles
Volvo Women's Open - Doubles
 in women's tennis